John Philip Gerretsen (born June 9, 1942) is a former politician in Ontario, Canada.  He was a Liberal member of the Legislative Assembly of Ontario from 1995 to 2014 who represented the eastern Ontario riding of Kingston and the Islands. He served as a Minister in the Cabinets of Premiers Dalton McGuinty and Kathleen Wynne.

Early life
Gerretsen was born in Hilversum, Netherlands during World War II, and moved to Canada with his parents in 1954.  He was educated at Queen's University in Kingston, Ontario, receiving a BA degree in 1964 and an LL.B in 1967.  He subsequently worked as a solicitor, serving with Manulife Insurance Company in Toronto from 1969 to 1970. His son Mark Gerretsen served as a Kingston, Ontario city councillor and was elected mayor in 2010.

Municipal politics
Gerretsen's political career began in the early 1970s at the municipal level.  He was elected as a Kingston Alderman in 1972, and remained on the City Council until 1980 (serving as Deputy Mayor from 1976 to 1980).  Gerretsen was elected Mayor of the city in 1980, and was re-elected twice before stepping down in 1988.  He was also President of the Association of Municipalities of Ontario from 1986 to 1987, and a trustee of Queen's University from 1981 to 1992.

After retiring from municipal politics, Gerretsen served as the Chair of the Ontario Housing Corporation (1989–1992) and was a Deputy Judge in the province's Small Claims Court (1993–1995).  He also became active in politics at the provincial and federal levels.  Gerretsen was an Executive Member of the Ontario Liberal Party's Kingston and the Islands riding association from 1989 to 1993, and was President of the Liberal Party of Canada's federal riding association from 1993 to 1995.

Provincial politics
Gerretsen was elected to the Ontario legislature in the provincial election of 1995, defeating Progressive Conservative candidate Sally Barnes and incumbent New Democrat Gary Wilson in Kingston and the Islands. This was a close three-way race—Gerretsen received 10,314 votes, Barnes 8,571, and Wilson 8,052.

The general election was won by the Progressive Conservatives and Gerretsen entered parliament as a member of the opposition, serving as Opposition Critic on Municipal Affairs and Housing and Chief Opposition Whip.

In 1996, he ran to succeed Lyn McLeod as leader of the Ontario Liberal Party.  Gerretsen was generally regarded as being on the right-wing of the party, and achieved some support in his home base of eastern Ontario.  He placed fifth out of seven candidates on the first ballot, and dropped out after the second ballot.  After withdrawing, he gave his support to Dalton McGuinty, the eventual winner.

Gerretsen was easily re-elected in the 1999 provincial election, although the Progressive Conservatives were again victorious across the province.  Gerretsen continued as Opposition Whip, and remained a vocal Liberal MPP for the next four years.

McGuinty government
The Liberal Party won the 2003 election with 72 seats out of 103, and Gerretsen was re-elected with over 60% support.  On October 23, 2003, he was named Minister of Municipal Affairs, with responsibility for Seniors.  In March 2004, his portfolio was renamed the Ministry of Municipal Affairs and Housing.

Gerretsen was the primary spokesperson for the McGuinty government in its controversial decision to permit further housing expansion on the Oak Ridges Moraine, despite an election promise not to do so.  The Liberals claimed that they lacked the legal authority to prevent further development in the area. His main legislative success has been in leading in the enactment of a 1.8 million acre (7,300 km²) green belt surrounding the City of Toronto in 2005.

After a cabinet shuffle on June 29, 2005, the responsibility for Seniors issues was transferred to another government minister. Gerretsen was retained as Minister of Municipal Affairs and Housing.

In the 2007 election of October 10, 2007, Gerretsen won re-election with just under 50 per cent support. On October 29, 2007, Gerretsen was appointed as Minister of the Environment.

On August 18, 2010, Gerretsen was moved to the post of Minister of the Consumer Services.

He won re-election in the October 6, 2011 election. He was appointed Attorney General of Ontario and was re-appointed when Kathleen Wynne became premier in early 2013.

On October 25, 2013, Gerretsen announced that he would not run in the next election. Just before his retirement at the June 2014 election, Gerretsen was moved from the Attorney-General portfolio to that of Chair of Cabinet.

Cabinet positions

Electoral record

Personal life
On March 19, 2020, amid the coronavirus pandemic, Gerretsen tested positive for COVID-19, with his wife Assunta testing positive earlier that week, after they were both repatriated to Canada from the Grand Princess cruise ship; they were quarantined at CFB Trenton.

References

External links

1942 births
21st-century Canadian politicians
Living people
Attorneys General of Ontario
Dutch emigrants to Canada
Lawyers in Ontario
Mayors of Kingston, Ontario
Ontario Liberal Party MPPs
Queen's University at Kingston alumni
People from Hilversum